This is a list of Biggles books by W. E. Johns.
Some of stories were first published in magazines including The Modern Boy books were published later, while some stories were later published in magazines. Some books were published under different names, some stories were published in more books. The number of books is between 84-101. Including the short stories there are 274 stories, but 4 books and one story are from the Gimlet series and Biggles is only a minor character.

Notes 
Biggles appears in 4 Gimlet books too.

References 

Lists of books